Cyril John Walker (24 February 1914 – July 2002) was an English professional football player and manager.

Career
Born in Newport Pagnell, Walker started his football career as a striker in Hertfordshire, with Hitchin Town and Leavesden Mental Hospital. He joined Watford as a professional in 1935, but after failing to play a competitive game, joined Gillingham at the end of the 1936–37 season. His time at Gillingham was brief; after scoring 4 goals in 11 competitive games, he moved clubs again in October 1937, this time to Sheffield Wednesday. He spent most of the rest of his career in English wartime or non-league football, but had a brief spell at Norwich City in 1946–47, before finishing his playing days at Snowdown Colliery Welfare, Dartford, Chatham Town and Margate. Following his playing career, Walker served as manager for Beckenham and in 1955/6 for Ware.

References

Sheffield Wednesday F.C. players
Watford F.C. players
Gillingham F.C. players
Margate F.C. players
Norwich City F.C. players
Hitchin Town F.C. players
Chelmsford City F.C. players
Dartford F.C. players
Chatham Town F.C. players
English football managers
Beckenham Town F.C. managers
1914 births
2002 deaths
People from Newport Pagnell
English footballers
Association football forwards